Alan Schechter (1965–2005) was an American action movie producer best known for his trademark style of "Low budget films with big budget effects."

Personal life
Born in 1965 and raised in Cleveland to Lori and Morris Paul Schechter, Schechter graduated from Shaker Heights High School in 1983.  Alan's family was already in the media biz as his father Morris Schechter was a local radio personality in Cleveland in the 1950s and was known as the "Voice of Racing" because he broadcast local horse races.  Morris Paul Schechter later changed his name to Van Lane in 1950 after the radio station he was working for had a "Name the DJ" contest.

Schechter's mother died in a traffic accident when he was only 8 years old.

He began training as a survivalist in high school with the Posse Comitatus and kept his apartment full of emergency supplies including MREs, ammunition, tools, and even suture kits.

Schechter died at his home in Los Angeles on August 14, 2005 from a self-inflicted gunshot wound.

Education
He applied and accepted to California Institute of the Arts.

Career
During high school, he worked at Viacom's Public-access television cable TV channel in Cleveland organizing a live call-in show there for the Shaker Schools' levy campaign.
Alan started working in films in the late 1980s as a production assistant at Cannon Films.

His trademark quickly became low-budget films with big budget effects.

Alan began working as the personal assistant to mega producer, Joel Silver and Silver Films in 1991. He rose through the ranks and was involved in the production as an associate producer, producer or co-producer for such films as Fair Game, Double Tap, Renegade Force, Made Men, Proximity, Jane Doe and the TV series Next Action Star.

Filmography
 Proximity (2001) (producer)
 Made Men (1999) (co-producer)
 Renegade Force (1998) (writer/producer)
 Double Tap (1997) (co-producer)
 Fair Game (1995) (associate producer)
 Double Dragon (1994) (producer)
 Showdown (1993) (producer)
 The Last Boy Scout (1991) (assistant: Joel Silver)
 Ricochet (1991) (assistant: Michael Levy)

Television
 Bet Your Life (2004)
 Next Action Star (2004) TV series (producer: Cinema Action Unit)
 Jane Doe (2001)

Actor
"Next Action Star" (2004) TV series .... Judge (Casting Special)

References

External links
 
 Alan Schechter at VH1.com
 Alan Schechter at Hollywood.com
 Alan Schechter filmography at NYTimes.com Movies & TV (All Movie Guide and Baseline via The New York Times)
 

1965 births
People from Shaker Heights, Ohio
2005 deaths
Film producers from Ohio
Suicides by firearm in California